Charice is the debut EP by Filipino singer Jake Zyrus, credited under his pre-gender transition name Charice. It was released in May 2008 under Star Records.

This EP was made available on digital download through Amazon.com MP3 Download on October 14, 2008.

Content 
The EP, consisting of six songs and six backing tracks, is a combination of cover hits from Dolly Parton, Whitney Houston, Jennifer Holliday, Smokey Mountain, Preluders, Amy Diamond, and Jennifer Hudson.

Track listing 
 Either written or popularized by the artists in parentheses.
 "And I Am Telling You I'm Not Going" (popularized by Jennifer Holliday in 1981 and Jennifer Hudson in 2006)
 "It Can Only Get Better" (popularized by Amy Diamond in 2006)
 "I Will Always Love You" (popularized by Dolly Parton in 1973 and Whitney Houston in 1992)
 "Born to Love You Forever" (popularized by Preluders in 2003)
 "I Have Nothing" (popularized by Whitney Houston in 1992)
 "Mama" (popularized by Smokey Mountain in 1989)

References

Jake Zyrus albums
2008 debut EPs
Star Music EPs
Covers albums